Langenhoven Park is a large suburb in the city of Bloemfontein in South Africa

References

Suburbs of Bloemfontein